was a   after Hōtoku and before Kōshō. This period spanned the years from July 1452 through July 1455.

Change of era
 1452 : The era name was changed to mark an event or a number of events. The old era ended and a new one commenced in Hōtoku 4.

Events of the Kyōtoku era
 1453 (Kyōtoku 2, 6th month): The name of the Shōgun, "Yoshinari", was changed to Ashikaga Yoshimasa, which is the name by which he is more commonly known in modern times.
 1454 (Kyōtoku 3): Ashikaga Shigeuji orchestrated for the killing of Uesugi Noritada, thus beginning a series of conflicts for control of the Kantō; and this event would come to be known as the Kyōtoku no Ran.

Notes

References
 Hall, John Whitney. (1988). The Cambridge History of Japan: Medieval Japan. Cambridge: Cambridge University Press. 
 Nussbaum, Louis Frédéric and Käthe Roth. (2005). Japan Encyclopedia. Cambridge: Harvard University Press. ; OCLC 48943301
 Titsingh, Isaac. (1834). Nihon Odai Ichiran; ou,  Annales des empereurs du Japon.  Paris: Royal Asiatic Society, Oriental Translation Fund of Great Britain and Ireland. OCLC 5850691

External links
 National Diet Library, "The Japanese Calendar" -- historical overview plus illustrative images from library's collection

Japanese eras
1450s in Japan